The following lists events that happened during 1866 in South Africa.

Incumbents
 Governor of the Cape of Good Hope and High Commissioner for Southern Africa: Sir Philip Wodehouse.
 Lieutenant-governor of the Colony of Natal: Sir John Bisset (acting).
 State President of the Orange Free State: Jan Brand.
 President of the Executive Council of the South African Republic: Marthinus Wessel Pretorius (until 21 October).
 State President of the South African Republic: Marthinus Wessel Pretorius (from 22 October).

Events
March
 1 – Stellenbosch Gymnasium is opened, later to be renamed Stellenbosch University.

October
 22 – The office of State President of the South African Republic is created by constitutional amendment approved at a session of the Volksraad.

Unknown date
 India officially stops sending Indian labourers to Natal.
 Erasmus Jacobs discovers the  Eureka Diamond near Hopetown on the banks of the Orange River in the Cape of Good Hope.

Births
 3 April – J.B.M. Hertzog, Boer General and 3rd Prime Minister of South Africa. (d. 1942)

Deaths

References

South Africa
Years in South Africa
History of South Africa